Michael Robert Blick (born 20 September 1948) is an English former footballer who played in the Football League for Swindon Town playing as a centre back.

Blick replaced Frank Burrows in the starting line-up to play in the 2nd leg of the 1969 Anglo-Italian League Cup versus AS Roma. A game that Swindon Town won 4-0 (5-2 on aggregate).

Honours
Swindon Town
Anglo-Italian League Cup: 1969

References

1948 births
Living people
English footballers
Association football defenders
Swindon Town F.C. players
Corby Town F.C. players
English Football League players
Sportspeople from Gloucestershire